Clarkson may refer to:

People
Clarkson (surname)

Given name
Clarkson Nott Potter (1825–1882), American attorney and politician
Clarkson Frederick Stanfield (1793–1867), English painter

Places

Australia
 Clarkson, Western Australia
 Clarkson railway station, a Transperth station in the suburb

Canada
 Clarkson, Ontario
 Clarkson GO Station, a station in the GO Transit network located in the community

South Africa
 Clarkson, Eastern Cape

United States
 Clarkson, California, a ghost town in California
 Clarkson, Kentucky
 Clarkson, Maryland
 Clarkson, Missouri
 Clarkson, Nebraska
 Clarkson, New York, a town
 Clarkson (CDP), New York, a census-designated place in the town
 Clarkson, Ohio
 Clarkson, Oklahoma
 Clarkson, Texas

Education
 Clarkson College, Omaha, Nebraska, US
 Clarkson University, Potsdam, New York, US

Business
 Clarkson plc, a shipping services company

Television
 Clarkson (TV series), a British chat show presented by Jeremy Clarkson

See also
 Clarkston (disambiguation)